The 2014–15 NCAA Division I men's basketball season began in November with the 2K Sports Classic and ended with the Final Four in Indianapolis April 4–6.  Practices officially began on October 3.

Season headlines 
 May 14 – The NCAA announces its Academic Progress Rate (APR) sanctions for the 2014–15 school year. A total of 36 programs in 11 sports are declared ineligible for postseason play due to failure to meet the required APR benchmark, including the following eight Division I men's basketball teams:
 Alabama State
 Appalachian State
 Central Arkansas
 Florida A&M
 Houston Baptist
 Lamar
 Milwaukee
 San Jose State
 In addition to the above teams, the entire athletic program at Southern University, including the men's basketball team, is ineligible for postseason play due to failure to supply usable academic data to the NCAA.
 May 16 – The ACC and the SEC will use a 30-second shot clock during exhibition games on an experimental basis for the upcoming season.
 June 10 – Georgetown and Syracuse announce that their men's basketball rivalry, on hold since 2013 due to the Big East realignment, will resume in 2015–16. The initial contract will run for four seasons.
 November 3 – The AP preseason All-American team is named.  North Carolina junior guard Marcus Paige is the leading vote-getter with 57 of 65 possible votes.  Joining him on the team were Louisville junior forward Montrezl Harrell (56 votes), Wisconsin senior center Frank Kaminsky, Wichita State junior guard Fred VanVleet and Duke freshman center Jahlil Okafor.  Okafor was also the preseason Player of the Year.
 November 13 – The NCAA announced five future Final Four sites which include Glendale, Arizona (2017), San Antonio (2018), Minneapolis (2019), Atlanta (2020), and Indianapolis (2021).
 December 6 – NJIT, the lone Independent in Division 1 basketball, upsets 17th-ranked Michigan.
 January 2 – Cincinnati head coach Mick Cronin was placed in an advisory role to the team for the remainder of the season while dealing with a non-life-threatening vascular condition known as arterial dissection.
 February 3 – Turner Sports and CBS Sports announced that Bill Raftery and Grant Hill will replace Greg Anthony to call the 2015 NCAA tournament with the team of Jim Nantz and reporter Tracy Wolfson.
 February 4 – Syracuse announces that it has self-imposed a postseason ban in response to an ongoing NCAA investigation into infractions that occurred over much of the early 21st century.
 February 7 – Former North Carolina coach Dean Smith dies at his home in Chapel Hill at the age of 83.
 February 11 – Former UNLV coach Jerry Tarkanian died at the age of 84.
 March 6 – The NCAA announced the results of its investigation of the Syracuse men's basketball and football programs, levying the following penalties on the basketball program:
 A total of 108 wins in the 2004–05, 2005–06, 2006–07, 2010–11, and 2011–12 seasons were ordered vacated. This was the most wins ever taken away from a Division I men's program, and dropped Syracuse head coach Jim Boeheim from second on the all-time Division I wins list to sixth.
 Boeheim was initially suspended for the first nine games of the 2015–16 ACC season, which was later modified to the first 9 games immediately following the ruling of the NCAA Board of Appeals, beginning with the renewed rivalry game against The Georgetown University Hoyas 
 The program initially lost three scholarships for each of the following four seasons (through 2018–19), later reduced to two per season following an appeal by the University to the NCAA. 
 Recruiting was restricted for two seasons, and the program was placed on probation for five years.
 March 18 – In the wake of the Syracuse sanctions, Boeheim announces that he will retire at the end of the 2017–18 season, with top assistant Mike Hopkins his planned successor. Syracuse athletic director Daryl Gross announces his resignation, effective immediately.

Milestones and records
 January 25 – Duke coach Mike Krzyzewski became the first Division I men's coach with 1,000 career wins, following the Blue Devils' 77–68 win over St. John's at Madison Square Garden.
 February 7 – Kyle Collinsworth of BYU set a new single-season Division I record for triple-doubles. His 23 points, 12 rebounds, and 10 assists in the Cougars' 87–68 win at Loyola Marymount gave him five triple-doubles for the season, breaking a tie with four other players.
 February 25 – William & Mary guard Marcus Thornton surpassed Chet Giermak's school scoring record of 2,052. The mark had stood since 1950; the 65-year-old record had been the longest-standing school career scoring record in all of NCAA Division I basketball at the time it was broken.
 March 2 – Virginia became the first team not from Tobacco Road to win back-to-back outright Atlantic Coast Conference regular season championships.
 March 5 – Delaware State center Kendall Gray recorded 33 points and 30 rebounds against Coppin State, becoming the first NCAA Division I player to grab 30 rebounds in a game since December 14, 2005, and only the seventh overall in the past 40 seasons.
 March 9 – Collinsworth's 13 points, 14 rebounds, and 11 assists in BYU's 84–70 win over Portland in the West Coast Conference tournament semifinals gave him six triple-doubles for both this season and his career, tying him with Michael Anderson of Drexel and Shaquille O'Neal of LSU for the Division I career record.
 The following players surpassed 2,000 points in their career: BYU guard Tyler Haws, Auburn guard Antoine Mason, Stanford guard Chasson Randle, St. John's guard D'Angelo Harrison, Oregon guard Joe Young, San Diego guard Johnny Dee, William & Mary guard Marcus Thornton, Marist forward Chauvaughn Lewis, Green Bay guard Keifer Sykes, Penn State guard D. J. Newbill and Providence forward LaDontae Henton.

Conference membership changes

The 2014–15 season saw the final wave of membership changes resulting from a major realignment of NCAA Division I conferences. The cycle began in 2010 with the Big Ten and the then-Pac-10 publicly announcing their intentions to expand. The fallout from these conferences' moves later affected a majority of D-I conferences.

This was also the final season for Texas–Pan American (UTPA) under that name. At the start of the 2015–16 school year, UTPA merged with the University of Texas at Brownsville to form the new University of Texas Rio Grande Valley (UTRGV). UTPA's athletic program and WAC membership were inherited by UTRGV.

It was also the final season for Northern Kentucky in the Atlantic Sun Conference (A-Sun) and the final season for NJIT as an independent. On May 11, 2015, it was announced that Northern Kentucky would join the Horizon League effective July 1. The A-Sun soon filled the place left by Northern Kentucky, announcing on June 12 that NJIT would become a member effective on July 1.

Season outlook

Pre-season polls

The top 25 from the AP and USA Today Coaches Polls.

Regular season

Early-season tournaments

*Although these tournaments include more teams, only the number listed play for the championship.

Conference winners and tournaments
Thirty-one athletic conferences each end their regular seasons with a single-elimination tournament. The teams in each conference that win their regular season title are given the number one seed in each tournament. The winners of these tournaments receive automatic invitations to the 2015 NCAA Men's Division I Basketball Tournament. The Ivy League does not have a conference tournament, instead giving their automatic invitation to their regular season champion.

Statistical leaders

Conference standings

Postseason tournaments

NCAA tournament

Final Four – Lucas Oil Stadium

Tournament upsets
For this list, a "major upset" is defined as a win by a team seeded 7 or more spots below its defeated opponent.

National Invitation tournament

After the NCAA tournament field is announced, the NCAA invited 32 teams to participate in the National Invitation Tournament. The tournament began on March 17, 2015 with all games prior to the semifinals played on campus sites. The semifinals and final were held on March 31 and April 2 at Madison Square Garden in New York City.

College Basketball Invitational

The sixth College Basketball Invitational (CBI) Tournament began on March 17, 2015 and ended with Loyola-Chicago's two-game sweep of Louisiana-Monroe. This tournament featured 16 teams who were left out of the NCAA tournament and NIT.

CollegeInsider.com Postseason tournament

The fifth CollegeInsider.com Postseason Tournament began on March 16 and ended with that championship game on April 2. The Evansville Purple Aces won their first postseason tournament, defeating Northern Arizona in the final. This tournament places an emphasis on selecting successful teams from "mid-major" conferences who were left out of the NCAA tournament and NIT.  32 teams participated in this tournament.

Award winners

Consensus All-American teams

The following players are recognized as the 2015 Consensus All-Americans:

Major player of the year awards
Wooden Award: Frank Kaminsky, Wisconsin
Naismith Award: Frank Kaminsky, Wisconsin
Associated Press Player of the Year: Frank Kaminsky, Wisconsin
NABC Player of the Year: Frank Kaminsky, Wisconsin
Oscar Robertson Trophy (USBWA): Frank Kaminsky, Wisconsin
Sporting News Player of the Year: Frank Kaminsky, Wisconsin

Major freshman of the year awards
Wayman Tisdale Award (USBWA): Jahlil Okafor, Duke

Major coach of the year awards
Associated Press Coach of the Year: John Calipari, Kentucky
Henry Iba Award (USBWA):  Tony Bennett, Virginia
NABC Coach of the Year:  John Calipari, Kentucky
Naismith College Coach of the Year: John Calipari, Kentucky
 Sporting News Coach of the Year: John Calipari, Kentucky

Other major awards
Bob Cousy Award (Best point guard): Delon Wright, Utah
Jerry West Award (Best shooting guard): D'Angelo Russell, Ohio State
Julius Erving Award (Best small forward): Stanley Johnson, Arizona
Karl Malone Award (Best power forward): Montrezl Harrell, Louisville
Kareem Abdul-Jabbar Award (Best center): Frank Kaminsky, Wisconsin
Pete Newell Big Man Award (Best big man): Jahlil Okafor, Duke
NABC Defensive Player of the Year: Willie Cauley-Stein, Kentucky
Senior CLASS Award (top senior): Alex Barlow, Butler
Robert V. Geasey Trophy (Top player in Philadelphia Big 5): Darrun Hilliard, Villanova
Haggerty Award (Top player in New York City metro area): Sir'Dominic Pointer, St. John's
Ben Jobe Award (Top minority coach): Bobby Collins, Maryland Eastern Shore
Hugh Durham Award (Top mid-major coach): Brian Katz, Sacramento State
Jim Phelan Award (Top head coach): Bob Huggins, West Virginia
Lefty Driesell Award (Top defensive player): Darion Atkins, Virginia
Lou Henson Award (Top mid-major player): Ty Greene, USC Upstate
Lute Olson Award (Top non-freshman or transfer player): Cameron Payne, Murray State
Skip Prosser Man of the Year Award (Coach with moral character): Keno Davis, Central Michigan
Academic All-American of the Year (Top scholar-athlete): Matt Townsend, Yale
Elite 89 Award (Top GPA among upperclass players at Final Four): Colby Wollenman, Michigan State

Coaching changes
A number of teams changed coaches during and after the season.

See also
 2014–15 NCAA Division I women's basketball season

Notes

References